Shirley Ho is an American astrophysicist and machine learning expert, currently at the Center for Computational Astrophysics at Flatiron Institute in NYC and at the New York University and the Carnegie Mellon University. Ho also has visiting appointment at Princeton University.

A cited expert in cosmology, machine learning applications in astrophysics and data science, her interests include developing and deploying deep learning techniques to better understand our Universe, and other astrophysical phenomena.

She significantly contributed to the development of several fields, including: cosmic microwave background, cosmological models, dark energy, dark matter, spatial distribution of galaxies and quasars, Baryon Acoustic Oscillations, cosmological simulations and applications of machine learning to cosmology and astrophysics. More recently, Shirley Ho has led her team on a series of papers on accelerating simulations using modern deep learning techniques, and developing techniques in interpretable machine learning for science.

Education 
Shirley Ho graduated summa cum laude with a B.A. in Physics and a B.A. in Computer Science at University of California at Berkeley after completing multiple senior thesis projects in both physics and theoretical computer science in 2004. As an undergraduate, she has researched under guidance of Kam-Biu Luk in particle physics for three years, before working on weak lensing of Cosmic Microwave Background under the supervision of Uros Seljak at Princeton. She then wrote two papers in cosmology under the guidance of Martin White as a senior. Shirley Ho moved to Princeton University to pursue her Ph.D. at the Department of Astrophysical Sciences of Princeton University under the supervision of astrophysicist and cosmologist David Spergel.  In 2008 she obtained her doctorate in Astrophysical Sciences, with a Thesis entitled "Baryons, Universe and Everything Else in Between".

Career 
After her Ph.D., she moved to the Lawrence Berkeley National Laboratory between 2008 and 2012, in a postdoctoral position as a Chamberlain and a Seaborg Fellow. Later on, she moved to the Carnegie Mellon University, first as an assistant professor and then as an associate (with indefinite tenure) professor in Physics. Shirley Ho was named Cooper-Siegel Development Chair Professor in 2015 at Carnegie Mellon University.

In 2016, Shirley Ho joined Lawrence Berkeley National Laboratory as a Senior Scientist while being on leave from Carnegie Mellon University. In 2018, Shirley Ho joined the Simons Foundation as leader of the Cosmology X Data Science group at Center for Computational Astrophysics (CCA) at the Flatiron Institute. She also currently holds faculty positions at New York University and Carnegie Mellon University. In 2021, Shirley Ho was named the Interim Director of CCA at the Flatiron Institute in 2021.

Prizes 
Shirley Ho won several prizes for her significant contributions to the fields of cosmology and astrophysics. The list includes:

 NASA Group Achievement Award (2011) for contribution to Planck mission.
Macronix Prize (2014): The Outstanding Young Researcher Award by International Organization of Chinese Physicists and Astronomers.
 Carnegie Science Award (2015)
 Elected as International Astrostatistics Association Fellow, 2020.

References 

American astrophysicists
American cosmologists
21st-century American astronomers
Year of birth missing (living people)
Living people
University of California, Berkeley alumni
Princeton University alumni
American women scientists
American women astronomers
21st-century American women scientists
Astrostatisticians